Augustus Francis Johns (September 10, 1899 – September 12, 1975) was a pitcher in Major League Baseball. He played for the Detroit Tigers.

References

External links

1899 births
1975 deaths
Major League Baseball pitchers
Detroit Tigers players
Baseball players from St. Louis